The Caribou Kitchen is a 1995 CITV animated television series, aimed particularly at pre-school children, which is about an anthropomorphic caribou named Claudia who runs a restaurant in the fictional town of Barkabout which serves a number of talking animal guests, including Mrs Panda, Caroline the Cow, Gerald the Giraffe and Taffy the Tiger. Other recurring supporting characters included the chef Abe the Anteater, and waiters Lisa the Lemur and Tom the Tortoise. Each of the 52 episodes lasts 10 minutes and intends to teach its pre-school audiences important lessons. Narration and character voices are provided by Kate Robbins in the UK. The rights to the show are owned by Universal Television, the current successor of Entertainment Rights.

Characters
 Claudia the Caribou (title character)
 Caroline the Cow
 Mrs Panda
 Taffy the Tiger
 Cyril the Squirrel
 Abe the Anteater (the cook)
 Lisa the Lemur (the waitress)
 Kevin the Chameleon
 Tom the Tortoise (the waiter)
 Hector the Hippopotamus
 Godfrey the Goat
 Helen the Hamster
 Betty the Beaver
 Flora the Frog
 Sophie the Swallow
 Penelope the Porcupine
 Gerald the Giraffe

Episodes

Season 1 (1995)

Season 2 (1995)

References

External links

1990s British animated television series
1995 British television series debuts
1998 British television series endings
British children's animated television shows
Fictional restaurants
ITV children's television shows
Television series about deer and moose
Television series by STV Studios
Television series by Universal Television